The Ambassador of Malaysia to the State of Kuwait is the head of Malaysia's diplomatic mission to Kuwait. The position has the rank and status of an Ambassador Extraordinary and Plenipotentiary and is based in the Embassy of Malaysia, Kuwait City.

List of heads of mission

Ambassadors to Kuwait

See also
 Kuwait–Malaysia relations

References 

 
Kuwait
Malaysia